Cyclocheilichthys heteronema is a species of ray-finned fish in the genus Cyclocheilichthys. They inhabit freshwater bodies of water in the Malay Peninsula, Borneo, and the Chao Phraya and Mekong basins.

Description 
Growing to the maximum length of 12 cm, it is among the smallest of its genus.

A plainly colored fish but some freshly caught specimens may show a slightly bluish sheen. 

It's most unique characteristic is their impressively branched maxillary barbels, which they use to sift through the muddy or silty bottoms of rivers for food.

References 

 

heteronema
Fish of Thailand
Fish described in 1853